Origanum laevigatum is a species of flowering plant in the family Lamiaceae, native to Cyprus, Syria, and Turkey.

This plant is used as a culinary herb, as an ornamental plant in herb gardens, and as groundcover in sunny, well-drained situations. It tolerates poor soil, but dislikes winter wetness. The species, and the cultivars ‘Rosenkuppel’ and  'Herrenhausen' have gained the Royal Horticultural Society's Award of Garden Merit.

References

laevigatum
Flora of Western Asia
Plants described in 1854
Garden plants
Taxa named by Pierre Edmond Boissier